Shirkoshi (also Romanized as Shīrkoshī) is a village in Nargesan Rural District, Jebalbarez-e Jonubi District, Anbarabad County, Kerman Province, Iran. At the 2006 census, its population was 114, in 23 families.

References 

Populated places in Anbarabad County